Calceolaria tomentosa is a perennial plant belonging to the genus Calceolaria and native to Peru.

Calceolaria tomentosa can reach a height of about 1 meter (3 feet). It has soft, wide cordate leaves and a soft stem. The flowers are yellow.

References

External links
 IPNI Listing

tomentosa
Flora of Peru